Bonnie Briar County Club is an 18-hole golf course and country club located in the Town of Mamaroneck in Westchester County, New York. The original course architect was Devereux Emmet, and it was later amended by A. W. Tillinghast. Alfred H. Tull, Geoffrey Cornish  and Robert Trent Jones also contributed to various aspects of the course layout, drainage, tees, greens and bunkers. The course design made use of Bonnie Briar's hilly and low wetland areas, surrounding a wooded interior.

After World War I, real estate activity in the Town of Mamaroneck surged and the number of families moving into the area brought about a need for country and beach clubs which were then few in number. The land had belonged to the Lyman Bill estate. Colonel E. Lyman Bill, a successful publisher and one of Theodore Roosevelt's Rough Riders, had owned a large piece of property along the Mamaroneck and New Rochelle border, on which he had a private club with tennis courts and a rudimentary golf course.

The first and ninth fairways became the site of the first golf layout in the United States. The Colonel wanted to build a palatial residence on his estate, yet died before its completion. The Bonnie Briar Country Club was then organized in 1921 with the financial assistance of the Bill family. The first president was the Colonel's son, Edward Lyman Bill, who finished construction of the clubhouse.

The full course was opened in 1923.

Notable members

 Doug Ford, PGA golfer
 Norman Rockwell, 20th-century American illustrator
 Robert Moses, 20th-century American urban planner

References

Golf clubs and courses in New York (state)
Mamaroneck, New York
Sports venues in Westchester County, New York
Golf clubs and courses designed by A. W. Tillinghast
1921 establishments in New York (state)